Penonomé is the capital of the Panamanian province of Coclé. The town is located in the geographic center of Panama  along the Inter-American Highway in the wide, flat lowlands of central Coclé.

History

Overview
Penonomé was founded in 1581. The name of this town comes from the words "penó Nomé". Nomé was a chief of a local Native American tribe who resisted the Spanish conquistadores and was put to death by colonial officials. "Penó Nomé" means "Nomé was punished." The town was the capital of Panama for a short period after Panama City was sacked by Henry Morgan in 1671.

The town is home to many descendants of Turkish, Chinese, and Arab immigrants. Its population as of 1990 was 12,117; its population as of 2000 was 15,841.

Local legend 
Local legend (unknown origin) has it that Nomé was a chieftain in love with an indigenous woman named Zaratí.  His tribe didn't want him to marry and so told him that his beloved had drowned.  Trying desperately and without success to find her, he threw himself from a bluff, crying out "I'm coming Zara!"  Hence the names of the Zaratí River and Penonomé ("Penó Nomé" in Spanish meaning "Nomé mourned", with subject and verb inverted).

Landmarks
The Catedral de Penonomé and the municipal government office (Casa de Gobierno) are located on the town's central plaza. The town also has a small museum, El Museo de Penonomé, which is often closed. The town has two main shopping streets, Avenida Juan Demóstenes Arosemena and the Inter-American Highway along the edge of town.

Transport
Penonomé is served by buses to many locations in Panama.

Notable people
Esther Neira de Calvo (1890-1978) - women's rights activist
Diana Jaén - Miss World Panama 2015

References

External links

Populated places in Coclé Province
Corregimientos of Coclé Province
Penonomé, Coclé
Populated places established in 1581